Trzcianka-Kolonia  (till December 31, 2001 as at Kolonia Trzcianka) is a colony in the administrative district of Gmina Osiek, within Staszów County, Świętokrzyskie Voivodeship, in south-central Poland.

The village has a population of  89.

Demography 
According to the 2002 Poland census, there were 100 people residing in Trzcianka-Kolonia village, of whom 48% were male and 52% were female. In the village, the population was spread out, with 28% under the age of 18, 34% from 18 to 44, 22% from 45 to 64, and 16% who were 65 years of age or older.
 Figure 1. Population pyramid of village in 2002 — by age group and sex

Former parts of village — physiographic objects 
In the years 1970 of last age, sorted and prepared out list part of names of localities for Trzcianka Folwarczna — at type of settlement now is a colony Trzcianka-Kolonia, what you can see in table 3.

References

Villages in Staszów County